This page provides a list of British philosophers; of people who either worked within Great Britain, or the country's citizens working abroad.



A
 A. J. Ayer
 J. L. Austin

B
 Francis Bacon
 Roger Bacon
 Julian Baggini
 Thomas Baldwin
 Alexander Bain
 John Renford Bambrough
 Owen Barfield
 Jonathan Barnes
 David Bell
 Piers Benn
 Jonathan Bennett
 Jeremy Bentham
 George Berkeley 
 Isaiah Berlin
 Simon Blackburn
 George Boole
 Mary Everest Boole
 F. H. Bradley
 R. B. Braithwaite
 Ray Brassier
 C. D. Broad
 John Broome
 Thomas Browne
 Malcolm Budd
 Jeremy Butterfield

C
 John Cartwright
 Quassim Cassam
 Peter Caws
 G. K. Chesterton
 Stephen R. L. Clark
 Frances Power Cobbe
 Catherine Trotter Cockburn
 David Cockburn
 R. G. Collingwood
 David Conway
 John Cook Wilson
 David E. Cooper 
 Edward Craig
 Tim Crane
 David Cranston
 Roger Crisp
 Simon Critchley
 Helena Cronin
 Ralph Cudworth
 Nathaniel Culverwel

D
 Augustus De Morgan
 Peter Dews
 Ramsey Dukes
 Michael Dummett
 Duns Scotus

E
 Dorothy Edgington
 Nader El-Bizri
 Ronald Englefield
 Dylan Evans
 Gareth Evans
 A. C. Ewing

F
 Antony Flew
 Philippa Foot
 Keith Frankish
 Paul W. Franks
 Miranda Fricker

G
 W. B. Gallie
 Patrick Gardiner
 Peter Geach
 Raymond Geuss
 Margaret Gilbert
 Jonathan Glover
 William Godwin
 Iain Hamilton Grant
 John N. Gray
 A. C. Grayling
 Celia Green
 Thomas Hill Green
 John Grote
 David Guest

H
 Susan Haack
 Peter Hacker
 John Joseph Haldane
 Bob Hale
 R. M. Hare
 Harold Foster Hallett
 Jane Heal
 Erich Heller
 John Hick
 J. M. Hinton
 Thomas Hobbes
 Angie Hobbs
 Ted Honderich
 Jennifer Hornsby
 Paul Horwich
 Gillian Howie
 Colin Howson
 David Hume
 Francis Hutcheson
Aldous Huxley

J
 Harold Joachim
 C. E. M. Joad
 John Foster
 John Henry Newman

K
 Bernard Philip Kelly
 Anthony Kenny
 Damien Keown
 Philip Kitcher
 Augusta Klein
 Martha Klein
 Brian Klug
 William Angus Knight
 Arthur Koestler
 Stephan Körner
 Martin Kusch

L
 John Laird
 Nick Land
 Rae Helen Langton
 Vernon Lee
 Mike Lesser
 John Levy
 C.S. Lewis
 Casimir Lewy
 John Locke
 E.J. Lowe
 John Lucas
 Anthony Ludovici

M
 John McDowell
 Cecil Alec Mace
 Margaret MacDonald
 J. L. Mackie
 John Macmurray
 Fiona Macpherson
 Bryan Magee
 Nicholas Maxwell
 Hugh Mellor
 Mary Midgley
 John Stuart Mill
 Alan Millar
 David Miller
 Ray Monk
 George Edward Moore
 Charles Morris, Baron Morris of Grasmere
 Stephen Mulhall
 Kevin Mulligan
 Stephen Mumford
 Iris Murdoch
 Geoffrey Reginald Gilchrist Mure

N
 Constance Naden
 Stephen Neale

O
 Michael Oakeshott
 Kieron O'Hara
 Onora O'Neill, Baroness O'Neill of Bengarve
 William of Ockham
 Sydney Sparkes Orr

P
 Thomas Paine
 William Paley
 David Papineau
 Derek Parfit
 Christopher Peacocke
 David Pearce
 William Penn
 Sadie Plant
 Michael Polanyi
 Karl Popper
 Ullin Place
 Graham Priest

Q
 Anthony Quinton, Baron Quinton

R
 Janet Radcliffe Richards
 Hastings Rashdall
 Frank P. Ramsey
 Carveth Read
 Rupert Read
 Thomas Reid
 R. R. Rockingham Gill
 Gonzalo Rodríguez Pereyra
 Gillian Rose
 Robert Rowland Smith
 Richard Rufus of Cornwall
 Bertrand Russell
 Gilbert Ryle

S
 Mark Sacks
 Mark Sainsbury
 F. C. S. Schiller
 Roger Scruton
 Niall Shanks
 Mary Shepherd
 Henry Sidgwick
 Peter Simons
 Timothy Smiley
 Adam Smith
 Alic Halford Smith
 Kate Soper
 William Ritchie Sorley
 Timothy Sprigge
 Olaf Stapledon
 Susan Stebbing
 James Hutchison Stirling
 William Stoddart
 Alan Stout
 George Stout
 Galen Strawson
 P. F. Strawson
 Richard Swinburne

T
 Alfred Edward Taylor
 Gabriele Taylor
 Jenny Teichman
 George Derwent Thomson
 John Toland

U
 J. O. Urmson

W
 Alfred North Whitehead
 Richard Rudolf Walzer
 James Ward
 Mary Warnock, Baroness Warnock
 Alan Watts
 Jonathan Westphal
 William Whewell
 Jamie Whyte
 David Wiggins
 Bernard Williams
 Timothy Williamson
 Gerrard Winstanley
 John Wisdom
 Ludwig Wittgenstein
 Richard Wollheim
 Crispin Wright
 Frances Wright

References

British